The Lady of Lebanon may refer to:

 The Lady of Lebanon (1934 film), a French thriller film
 The Lady of Lebanon (1926 film), a French silent drama film